Sugár Katinka Battai (born 17 April 2003) is a Hungarian fencer. She competed in the women's team sabre event at the 2020 Summer Olympics.

Career

World Championship

World Cup

References

External links
 

2003 births
Living people
Hungarian female sabre fencers
Olympic fencers of Hungary
Fencers at the 2020 Summer Olympics
Place of birth missing (living people)
World Fencing Championships medalists
21st-century Hungarian women